William W. Perry was a member of the Wisconsin State Assembly during the 1872 session. Other positions he held include Chairman of the Town Board (similar to city council) of Sumpter, Wisconsin in 1867, 1868, 1870 and 1871. He was a Republican. Perry was born on October 25, 1834, in Aurora, Erie County, New York.

References

People from Erie County, New York
People from Sumpter, Wisconsin
Republican Party members of the Wisconsin State Assembly
Wisconsin city council members
1834 births
Year of death missing